The 1899–1900 Sheffield Shield season was the eighth season of the Sheffield Shield, the domestic first-class cricket competition of Australia. New South Wales won the championship.

Table

Statistics

Most Runs
Monty Noble 515

Most Wickets
Monty Noble 24 & George Giffen 24

References

Sheffield Shield
Sheffield Shield
Sheffield Shield seasons